Elopichthys bambusa, the yellowcheek or kanyu, is a large cyprinid fish that is found in freshwater habitats in eastern Asia. It ranges from the Amur River in Russia, through China to the Red and Lam Rivers in Vietnam. It prefers relatively warm waters, entirely avoiding colder highlands.

This fish spawns in the summer, mainly in streams in places like the mid-Amur, Songhua and Ussuri basins. In the Amur, young are found in the lower sections. They mature after 6 years, and after this time they tend to live in floodplains and winter in the main rivers. They mainly consume smaller fish.

From the 1970s to 1990s, the population of yellowcheeks drastically decreased, but in the 2010s the population has been observed to increase. The species appears to have disappeared entirely from the Yellow River basin. Major threats are dam construction, pollution, and overfishing. However, little is known about the overall trends of this species. As of 2012 there were no conservation measures in place, and it is unknown if such measures are necessary.

References

Cyprinid fish of Asia
Fish described in 1845